The Crazy Family (Swedish: Snurriga familjen) is a 1940 Swedish comedy film directed by Ivar Johansson and starring Thor Modéen, Elsa Carlsson and Åke Söderblom. It was shot at the Råsunda Studios in Stockholm. The film's sets were designed by the art director Arne Åkermark. It marked the film debut of the future star Viveca Lindfors.

Cast
 Thor Modéen as 	Direktör Blom
 Elsa Carlsson as 	Fru Laura Blom
 Åke Söderblom as 	Unge herr Blom
 Eivor Landström as 	Fröken Blom
 Allan Bohlin as 	John
 Annalisa Ericson as 	Fröken Stålhammar 
 Eric Abrahamsson as 	Portier Svensson 
 Carl Barcklind s 	Direktör Bergsten
 Åke Engfeldt as 	Direktör Rosén
 Viveca Lindfors as 	Lisa
 Carin Swensson as 	Restaurant Guest 
 Anna-Lisa Baude as 	Emilia Orre
 Viran Rydkvist as 	Cook
 Elsa Ebbesen as 	Mrs. Pihl
 Ingrid Foght as 	Hotel Guest
 Maj-Britt Håkansson as 	Hotel Guest 
 John Botvid as 	Pettersson
 Rolf Botvid as 	Göran Welander
 Artur Cederborgh as 	Night Porter
 Ragnar Widestedt as 	Broden
 Artur Rolén as Nilsson
 Arne Lindblad as 	Hotel Guest
 Bertil Unger as Hotel Guest / Dancer 
 Gustaf Unger as 	Hotel Guest / Dancer

References

Bibliography 
 Qvist, Per Olov & von Bagh, Peter. Guide to the Cinema of Sweden and Finland. Greenwood Publishing Group, 2000.

External links 
 

1940 films
Swedish comedy films
1940 comedy films
1940s Swedish-language films
Films directed by Ivar Johansson
Swedish black-and-white films
1940s Swedish films